Nikolay Georgiev may refer to:

 Nikolay Georgiev (canoeist) (born 1960), Bulgarian sprint canoer
 Nikolay Georgiev (footballer) (born 1998), Bulgarian footballer